Newark has long been the largest city in New Jersey. Founded in 1666, it greatly expanded during the Industrial Revolution, becoming the commercial and cultural hub of the region. Its population grew with various waves of migration in the mid 19th century, peaking in 1950. It suffered greatly during the era of urban decline and suburbanization in the late 20th century. Since the millennium it has benefited from interest and re-investment in America's cities, recording population growth in the 2010 and 2020 censuses.

Founding and 18th century
Newark was founded in 1666 by Connecticut Puritans led by Robert Treat from the New Haven Colony to avoid losing political power to others not of their own church after the union of the Connecticut and New Haven colonies. It was the third settlement founded in New Jersey, after Bergen, New Netherland (later dissolved into Hudson County, then incorporated into Jersey City) and Elizabethtown (modern-day Elizabeth).

They sought to establish a colony with strict church rules similar to the one they had established in Milford, Connecticut.  Treat wanted to name the community "Milford."   Another settler, Abraham Pierson, had previously been a preacher in England's Newark-on-Trent, and adopted the name; he is also quoted as saying that the community reflecting the new task at hand should be named "New Ark" for "New Ark of the Covenant." The name was shortened to Newark. References to the name "New Ark" are found in preserved letters written by historical figures such as James McHenry dated as late as 1787.

Treat and the party bought the property on the Passaic River from the Hackensack Indians by exchanging gunpowder, 100 bars of lead, 20 axes, 20 coats, guns, pistols, swords, kettles, blankets, knives, beer, and ten pairs of breeches.

The first four settlers built houses at what is now the intersection of Broad Street and Market Street, also known as "Four Corners."

The total control of the community by the Puritan Church continued until 1733 when Josiah Ogden harvested wheat on a Sunday following a lengthy rainstorm and was disciplined by the Church for Sabbath breaking.  He left the church and corresponded with Episcopalian missionaries, who arrived to build a church in 1746 and broke up the Puritan theocracy.

It took 70 years to eliminate the last vestiges of theocracy from Newark, when the right to hold office was finally granted to non-Protestants.

First Landing Party of the Founders of Newark (1916) and  Indian and the Puritan (1916) are two of four public art works  created by Gutzon Borglum that are located in Newark commemorating the city's founding. They were added to the New Jersey Register of Historic Places on September 13, 1994, and the National Register of Historic Places on October 28, 1994 as part of a Multiple Property Submission, "The Public Sculpture of John de la Mothe Gutzon Borglum, 1911–1926".

Industrial era to 1900

Newark's rapid growth began in the early 19th century, much of it due to a Massachusetts transplant named Seth Boyden. Boyden came to Newark in 1815, and immediately began a torrent of improvements to leather manufacture, culminating in the process for making patent leather. Boyden's genius led to Newark's manufacturing nearly 90% of the nation's leather by 1870, bringing in $8.6 million in revenue to the city in that year alone. In 1824, Boyden, bored with leather, found a way to produce malleable iron. Newark also prospered by the construction of the Morris Canal in 1831. The canal connected Newark with the New Jersey hinterland, at that time a major iron and farm area.

Railroads arrived in 1834 and 1835. A flourishing shipping business resulted, and Newark became the area's industrial center. By 1826, Newark's population stood at 8,017, ten times the 1776 number.

The middle 19th century saw continued growth and diversification of Newark's industrial base. The first commercially successful plastic — Celluloid — was produced in a factory on Mechanic Street by John Wesley Hyatt. Hyatt's Celluloid found its way into Newark-made carriages, billiard balls, and dentures. Dr. Edward Weston perfected a process for zinc electroplating, as well as a superior arc lamp in Newark. Newark's Military Park had the first public electric lamps anywhere in the United States. Before moving to Menlo Park, Thomas Edison himself made Newark home in the early 1870s. He invented the stock ticker in the Brick City.

In the late 19th century, Newark's industry was further developed, especially through the efforts of such men as J. W. Hyatt. From the mid-century on, numerous Irish and German immigrants moved to the city. The Germans were primarily refugees from the revolutions of 1848, and, as other groups later did, established their own ethnic enterprises, such as newspapers and breweries. However, tensions existed between the "native stock" and the newer groups.

In the middle 19th century, Newark added insurance to its repertoire of businesses; Mutual Benefit was founded in the city in 1845 and Prudential in 1873. Prudential, or "the Pru" as generations knew it, was founded by another transplanted New Englander, John Fairfield Dryden.  He found a niche catering to the middle and lower classes. In the late 1880s, companies based in Newark sold more insurance than those in any city except Hartford, Connecticut.

In 1880, Newark's population stood at 136,500 in 1890 at 181,830; in 1900 at 246,070; and in 1910 at 347,000, a jump of 200,000 in three decades. As Newark's population approached a half million in the 1920s, the city's potential seemed limitless. It was said in 1927: "Great is Newark's vitality. It is the red blood in its veins – this basic strength that is going to carry it over whatever hurdles it may encounter, enable it to recover from whatever losses it may suffer and battle its way to still higher achievement industrially and financially, making it eventually perhaps the greatest industrial center in the world".

Sanitary conditions were bad throughout urban America in the 19th century, but Newark had an especially bad reputation because of the accumulation of human and horse waste built up on the city streets, its inadequate sewage systems, and the dubious quality of its water supply.

1900-1945

Newark was bustling in the early-to-mid-20th century. Market and Broad Streets served as a center of retail commerce for the region, anchored by four flourishing department stores: Hahne & Company, Bambergers and Company, S. Klein and Kresge-Newark. "Broad Street today is the Mecca of visitors as it has been through all its long history," Newark merchants boasted, "they come in hundreds of thousands now when once they came in hundreds."

In 1922, Newark had 63 live theaters, 46 movie theaters, and an active nightlife. Dutch Schultz was killed in 1935 at the local Palace Bar. Billie Holiday frequently stayed at the Coleman Hotel. By some measures, the intersection of Broad and Market Streets — known as the "Four Corners" — was the busiest intersection in the United States.  In 1915, Public Service counted over 280,000 pedestrian crossings in one 13-hour period. Eleven years later, on October 26, 1926, a State Motor Vehicle Department check at the Four Corners counted 2,644 trolleys, 4,098 buses, 2657 taxis, 3474 commercial vehicles, and 23,571 automobiles. Traffic in Newark was so heavy that the city converted the old bed of the Morris Canal into the Newark City Subway, making Newark one of the few cities in the country to have an underground system. Essex County was the first county park system in the country.
New skyscrapers were being built every year, the two tallest in the city being the Art Deco National Newark Building and the Lefcourt-Newark Building. In 1948, just after World War II, Newark hit its peak population of just under 450,000. The population also grew as immigrants from Southern and Eastern Europe settled there. Newark was the center of distinctive neighborhoods, including a large  Eastern European Jewish community concentrated along Prince Street. In 1959 German architect Ludwig Mies van der Rohe designed an apartment complex across from Branchbrook Park.

Post-World War II era

Problems existed underneath the industrial hum. In 1930, a city commissioner told the Optimists, a local booster club:

While many observers attributed Newark's decline to post-World War II phenomena, others point to an earlier decline in the city budget as an indicator of problems.  It fell from $58 million in 1938 to only $45 million in 1944.  This was a slow recovery from the Great Depression.  The buildup to World War II was causing an increase in the nation's economy.  The city increased its tax rate from $4.61 to $5.30.

Some attribute Newark's downfall to its propensity for building large housing projects.  Newark's housing had long been a matter of concern, as much of it was older. A 1944 city-commissioned study showed that 31 percent of all Newark dwelling units were below standards of health, and only 17 percent of Newark's units were owner-occupied. Vast sections of Newark consisted of wooden tenements, and at least 5,000 units failed to meet thresholds of being a decent place to live. Bad housing was the cause of demands that government intervene in the housing market to improve conditions.

Historian Kenneth T. Jackson and others theorized that Newark, with a poor center surrounded by middle-class outlying areas, only did well when it was able to annex middle-class suburbs. When municipal annexation broke down, urban problems were exacerbated as the middle-class ring became divorced from the poor center. In 1900, Newark's mayor had confidently speculated, "East Orange, Vailsburg, Harrison, Kearny, and Belleville would be desirable acquisitions. By an exercise of discretion we can enlarge the city from decade to decade without unnecessarily taxing the property within our limits, which has already paid the cost of public improvements." Only Vailsburg would ever be added.

Although numerous problems predated World War II, Newark was more hamstrung by a number of trends in the post-WWII era. The Federal Housing Administration redlined virtually all of Newark, preferring to back up mortgages in the white suburbs. This made it impossible for people to get mortgages for purchase or loans for improvements.  Manufacturers set up in lower wage environments outside the city and received larger tax deductions for building new factories in outlying areas than for rehabilitating old factories in the city. The federal tax structure essentially subsidized such inequities.

Billed as transportation improvements, construction of new highways: Interstate 280, the New Jersey Turnpike, and Interstate 78 harmed Newark. They directly hurt the city by dividing the fabric of neighborhoods and displacing many residents. The highways indirectly hurt the city because the new infrastructure made it easier for middle-class workers to live in the suburbs and commute into the city.

Despite its problems, Newark tried to remain vital in the postwar era. The city successfully persuaded Prudential and Mutual Benefit to stay and build new offices. Rutgers University-Newark, New Jersey Institute of Technology, and Seton Hall University expanded their Newark presences, with the former building a brand-new campus on a 23-acre (9 hectare) urban renewal site. The Port Authority of New York and New Jersey made Port Newark the first container port in the nation.  South of the city, during the postwar era, it took over operations at Newark Liberty International Airport, now the thirteenth busiest airport in the United States.

The city made serious mistakes with public housing and urban renewal, although these were not the sole causes of Newark's tragedy. Across several administrations, the city leaders of Newark considered the federal government's offer to pay for 100% of the costs of housing projects as a blessing. The decline in industrial jobs meant that more poor people needed housing, whereas in prewar years, public housing was for working-class families.  While other cities were skeptical about putting so many poor families together and were cautious in building housing projects, Newark pursued federal funds.  Eventually, Newark had a higher percentage of its residents in public housing than any other American city.

The largely Italian-American First Ward was one of the hardest hit by urban renewal. A 46-acre (19 hectare) housing tract, labeled a slum because it had dense older housing, was torn down for multi-story, multi-racial Le Corbusier-style high rises, named the Christopher Columbus Homes. The tract had contained 8th Avenue, the commercial heart of the neighborhood. Fifteen small-scale blocks were combined into three "superblocks". The Columbus Homes, never in harmony with the rest of the neighborhood, were vacated in the 1980s.  They were finally torn down in 1994. The Pavilion and Colonnade Apartments, built for middle-class families remain.

From 1950 to 1960, while Newark's overall population dropped from 438,000 to 408,000, it gained 65,000 non-whites. By 1966, Newark had a black majority, a faster turnover than most other northern cities had experienced. Evaluating the riots of 1967, Newark educator Nathan Wright, Jr. said, "No typical American city has as yet experienced such a precipitous change from a white to a black majority." The misfortune of the Great Migration and Puerto Rican migration was that Southern blacks and Puerto Ricans were moving to Newark to be industrial workers just as the industrial jobs were decreasing sharply. Many suffered the culture shock of leaving a rural area for an urban industrial job base and environment. The latest migrants to Newark left poverty in the South to find poverty in the North.

During the 1950s alone, Newark's white population decreased by more than 25 percent from 363,000 to 266,000. From 1960 to 1967, its white population fell further to 46,000. Although in-migration of new ethnic groups combined with white flight markedly affected the demographics of Newark, the racial composition of city workers did not change as rapidly.  In addition, the political and economic power in the city remained based in the white population.

In 1967, out of a police force of 1,400, only 150 members were black, mostly in subordinate positions.  Racial tensions arose because of the disproportion between residents and police demographics.  Since Newark's blacks lived in neighborhoods that had been white only two decades earlier, nearly all of their apartments and stores were white-owned as well. The loss of jobs affected overall income in the city, and many owners cut back on maintenance of buildings, contributing to a cycle of deterioration in housing stock.

Without consulting any residents of the neighborhood to be affected, Mayor Addonizio offered to condemn and raze 150 acres (61 hectares) of a densely populated black neighborhood in the central ward for the University of Medicine and Dentistry of New Jersey (UMDNJ). UMDNJ had wanted to settle in suburban Madison, NJ.

1967 Newark riots

On July 12, 1967, a taxi driver named John Smith was violently injured while respectfully accepting arrest. A crowd gathered outside the police station where Smith was detained. Due to miscommunication, the crowd believed Smith had died in custody, although he had been transported to a hospital via a back entrance to the station. This sparked scuffles between African Americans and police in the Fourth Ward, although the damage toll was only $2,500.

Subsequent to television news broadcasts on July 13 however, new and larger riots took place. Twenty-six people were killed; 1,500 wounded; 1,600 arrested; and $10 million in property was destroyed. More than a thousand businesses were torched or looted, including 167 groceries (most of which would never reopen). Newark's reputation suffered dramatically. It was said, "wherever American cities are going, Newark will get there first."

The long and short term causes of the riots are explored in depth in the documentary film Revolution '67.

After the riots

The 1970s and 1980s brought continued decline. Middle class residents of all races continued to flee the city.  Certain pockets of the city developed as domains of poverty and social isolation. Some say that whenever the media of New York needed to find some example of urban despair, they traveled to Newark.

In American Pastoral, the 1997 novel by Newark-born author Philip Roth, the protagonist Swede Levov says:

In January 1975, an article in Harper's Magazine ranked the 50 largest American cities in 24 categories, ranging from park space to crime. Newark was one of the five worst in 19 out of 24 categories, and the very worst in nine. According to the article, only 70 percent of residents owned a telephone.  St. Louis, the city ranked second worst, was much farther from Newark than the cities in the top five were from each other. The article concluded:

Newark has had several achievements in the two and a half decades since the riots. In 1968, the New Community Corporation was founded.  It has become one of the most successful community development corporations in the nation. By 1987, the NCC owned and managed 2,265 low-income housing units.

Newark's downtown began to redevelop in the post-riot decades. Less than two weeks after the riots, Prudential announced plans to underwrite a $24 million office complex near Penn Station, dubbed "Gateway." Today, Gateway houses thousands of white-collar workers, though few live in Newark.

Before the riots, the University of Medicine and Dentistry of New Jersey was considering building in the suburbs. The riots and Newark's undeniable desperation kept the medical school in the city.   However, instead of being built on 167 acres (676,000 m²), the medical school was built on just , part of which was already city owned.  Students at the medical school soon started the "Student Family Health Clinic" to provide free health care for the underserved population, along with other community service projects.  It continues to operate today as one of the nation's oldest student-run free health clinics.

In 1970, Kenneth A. Gibson was the first African-American to be elected mayor of Newark, as well as to be elected mayor of a major northeastern city. The 1970s were a time of battles between Gibson and the shrinking white population.  Gibson admitted that "Newark may be the most decayed and financially crippled city in the nation."  He and the city council raised taxes to try to improve services such as schools and sanitation, but they did nothing for Newark's economic base.  The CEO of Ballantine's Brewery asserted that Newark's $1 million annual tax bill was the cause of the company's bankruptcy.

Prior to the election of former mayor Cory Booker in 2006, Newark did not have a formal city planning department. As a result, a fellow at the Manhattan Institute for Policy Research concluded:

Newark's Renaissance

Downtown

The New Jersey Performing Arts Center, which opened in the downtown area in 1997 at a cost of $180 million, was seen by many as the first step in the city's road to revival, and brought in people to Newark who otherwise might never have visited. NJPAC is known for its acoustics, and features the New Jersey Symphony Orchestra as its resident orchestra. NJPAC also presents a diverse group of visiting artists such as Itzhak Perlman, Sarah Brightman, Sting, 'N Sync, Lauryn Hill, the Vienna Boys' Choir, Yo Yo Ma, the Royal Concertgebouw Orchestra of Amsterdam, and the Alvin Ailey American Dance Theater.

Since then, the city built a now demolished baseball stadium (Riverfront Stadium) for the Newark Bears, the city's former minor league team. In 2007, the Prudential Center (nicknamed, "The Rock") opened for the New Jersey Devils.  The Newark Public Library is planning a major renovation and expansion.  The Port Authority constructed a rail connection to the airport (AirTrain Newark).  Numerous commercial developments have arisen in the downtown area. Two public spaces have opened, Mulberry Commons and Newark Riverfront Park, the latter along Passaic River waterfront is being refurbished through downtown to provide citizens with access to the river.

While much of the city's revitalization efforts have been focused in the downtown area, adjoining neighborhoods have in recent years begun to see some signs of development, particularly in the Central Ward. Since 2000, Newark has gained population, its first increase since the 1940s.  Nevertheless, the "Renaissance" has been unevenly felt across the city and some districts continue to have below-average household incomes and higher-than-average rates of poverty.

By the mid-first decade of the 21st century, the rate of crime had fallen by 58% from historic highs associated with severe drug problems in the mid-1990s, though murders remained high for a city of its size.   In the first two months of 2008, the murder rate dropped dramatically, with no murders recorded for 43 days.

Newark's nicknames reflect the efforts to revitalize downtown.  In the 1950s the term New Newark was given to the city by then-Mayor Leo Carlin to help convince major corporations to remain in Newark.  In the 1960s Newark was nicknamed the Gateway City after the redeveloped Gateway Center area downtown, which shares its name with the tourism region of which Newark is a part, the Gateway Region. It has more recently been called the Renaissance City by the media and the public to gain recognition for its revitalization efforts.

Tech hub
Extensive fiber optic networks in Newark started in the 1990's when telecommunication companies installed fiber optic network to put Newark as a strategic location for data transfer between Manhattan and the rest of the country during the dot-com boom. At the same time, the city encouraged those companies to install more than they needed. A vacant department store was converted into a telecommunication center called 165 Halsey Street. It became one of the world's largest carrier hotels.  As a result after the dot-com bust, there were a surplus of dark fiber (unused fiber optic cables). Twenty years later, the city and other private companies started utilizing the dark fiber to create high performance networks within the city.

Since 2007, several technology oriented companies have moved to Newark: Audible (global headquarters, 2007), Panasonic (North America headquarters, 2013), AeroFarms (global headquarters, 2015), Broadridge Financial Solutions (1,000 jobs, 2017), WebMD (700 jobs, 2021), Ørsted (North American digital operations headquarters, 2021), and HAX Accelerator (US headquarters, 2021).

See also
 Timeline of Newark, New Jersey
 Sports in Newark, New Jersey

References
Notes

Further reading

External links
Newark History Society
Chronology of Newark 1666-1913 from History of the City of Newark New Jersey, Embracing Two and Half Centuries 1666–1913; Vol. II, Lewis Historical Publishing Co.; New York-Chicago; 1913
NJ Historical Society Map of Newark 1668
Signers of the pact forming the Newark colony
Excerpts from Brad Tuttle book
How Newark Became Newark